A commercial vehicle is any type of motor vehicle used for transporting goods or paying passengers.

The United States defines a "commercial motor vehicle" as any self-propelled or towed vehicle used on a public highway in interstate commerce to transport passengers or property when the vehicle:

1. has a gross vehicle weight rating of 4,536 kg (10,001 pounds) or more

2. Is designed or used to transport more than 8 passengers (including the driver) for compensation;

3. Is designed or used to transport more than 15 passengers, including the driver, not used to transport passengers for compensation;

4. Is used in transporting material found by the Secretary of Transportation to be hazardous.

The federal definition though followed closely is meant to accommodate and remain flexible to each state's definitions.

The European Union defines a "commercial motor vehicle" as any motorized road vehicle, that by its type of construction and equipment is designed for, and capable of transporting, whether for payment or not:

1. more than nine persons, including the driver;

2. goods and "standard fuel tanks". This means the tanks permanently fixed by the manufacturer to all motor vehicles of the same type as the vehicle in question and whose permanent fitting lets fuel be used directly, both for propulsion and, where appropriate, to power a refrigeration system. Gas tanks fitted to motor vehicles for the direct use of diesel as a fuel are considered standard fuel tanks.

Classification
In the United States a vehicle is designated "commercial" when it is titled or registered to a company. This is a broad definition, as commercial vehicles may be fleet vehicles, company cars, or other vehicles used for business. Vehicles that are designed to carry more than 15 passengers are considered a commercial vehicle. Variations may exist from state-to-state on which "commercial vehicles" are prohibited on certain routes and lanes and between homeowner associations, which may employ broader definitions than their municipalities with regard to their own parking restrictions.

Broadly defined, a vehicle may be considered a commercial vehicle if it:
 Belongs to a company or corporation
 Is used for business, but is in an individual's name, such as a sole proprietor
 Is a leased vehicle and in the name of the financial institution that owns it
 Exceeds a certain weight or class and therefore, is "classified" as commercial even though it may not be commercially used or commercially owned. A weight rating of 26,001 pounds or more is always considered commercial
 Is used to haul any hazardous material
 Starkey auxiliary reverse lighting as commercial even though backup/ reverse lighting on truck and suv vehicles commercially used or commercially owned.

A vehicle can be used for a business, if not exclusively, and remain privately licensed, depending on the amount of time used for business.

Commercial truck classification

Commercial trucks are classified according to the gross vehicle weight rating (GVWR). Commercial vehicles are divided into 8 classes based upon the gross vehicle weight (GVW). The United States Department of Transportation classifies commercial trucks with eight classes:
 Class 1 – GVWR ranges from 0 to 6,000 pounds (0 to 2,722 kg)
 Class 2 – GVWR ranges from 6,001 to 10,000 pounds (2,722 to 4,536 kg)
 Class 3 – GVWR ranges from 10,001 to 14,000 pounds (4,536 to 6,350 kg)
 Class 4 – GVWR ranges from 14,001 to 16,000 pounds (6,351 to 7,257 kg)
 Class 5 – GVWR ranges from 16,001 to 19,500 pounds (7,258 to 8,845 kg)
 Class 6 – GVWR ranges from 19,501 to 26,000 pounds (8,846 to 11,793 kg)
 Class 7 – GVWR ranges from 26,001 to 33,000 pounds (11,794 to 14,969 kg)
 Class 8 – GVWR is anything above 33,000 pounds (14,969 kg)

Examples of commercial vehicles
 Truck
 Box truck (also known as a straight truck)
 Semi-trailer truck (articulated lorry)
 Mini truck
 Pickup truck
 Tow truck
 Van
 Bus
 Coach
 Trailers
 Heavy equipment (in mining equipment, construction equipment, farming machinery)
 Travel Trailers over 10,000 pounds
 Taxi
Share taxi
 Auto rickshaw
 Motorcycle taxi

Preservation
Old commercial vehicles, like vintage cars, are popular items for preservation. News about preservation can be found in magazines, such as Heritage Commercials.

Legal issues
Commercial vehicle accidents and injuries are often more complex than regular car accidents, often involving additional concerns, background checks on operator driving records, and corporate maintenance records.

See also
 Utility vehicle: A utility vehicle is a vehicle, generally motorized, that is designed to carry out a specific task with more efficacy than a passenger vehicle. It sometimes refers to a truck with low sides.
 Bus driver
 Light commercial vehicle
 Large goods vehicle
 Light truck
 Truck classification
 Truck driver
 Violation out-of-service

References